Jean Auguste de Chastenet de Puységur (11 November 1740 – 14 August 1815, Rabastens) was a French Catholic bishop.

He was named bishop of Saint-Omer on 29 June 1775, then bishop of Carcassonne in 1778.  In 1788, he became the Archbishop of Bourges. A deputy to Estates-General of 1789, on the French Revolution he emigrated to Wolfenbüttel, where he lived with the archbishop of Rheims, Talleyrand-Périgord. The 1801 Concordat between France and the Pope forced him to resign, but allowed him to return to Rabastens, where he then lived until his death.

References

Archbishops of Bourges
Bishops of Carcassonne
Bishops of Saint-Omer
French politicians
1740 births
1815 deaths